Podkulachnik (also translated as "sub-kulak" or "kulak henchman") was a political label used in the Soviet Union in the 1920s and 1930s to brand people considered traitors to the Soviet Government.

History
Podkulachnik is considered by many to be a Stalinist neologism from the late 1920s. After the Russian Revolution, the Kulaks - relatively affluent and well-endowed peasants - were persecuted by the Soviet Government as class enemies of the poor, and hence enemies of the Revolution itself.

In other countries
In Hungary under Mátyás Rákosi, a Podkulachnik was called Kulákbérenc, meaning Kulak Hessian

See also
Dekulakization

References
 Aleksandr Solzhenitsyn. The Gulag Archipelago. Harper & Row, First Edition, 1973.

Notes

Political slurs for people
Social groups of Russia
Soviet phraseology
1920s neologisms

ru:Подкулачник